Gábor Hatos (born October 3, 1983 in Eger) is a male freestyle wrestler from Hungary.

He originally placed fifth at the 2012 Summer Olympics in the men's 74 kg category but was promoted to the bronze medal on November 7, 2012 after the disqualification of Uzbek Soslan Tigiev for doping.

References

External links
 bio on fila-wrestling.com
 

Living people
1983 births
Hungarian male sport wrestlers
Olympic wrestlers of Hungary
Wrestlers at the 2004 Summer Olympics
Wrestlers at the 2012 Summer Olympics
Olympic bronze medalists for Hungary
World Wrestling Championships medalists
Medalists at the 2012 Summer Olympics
Olympic medalists in wrestling
Sportspeople from Eger
21st-century Hungarian people